Edith Lilian Edmonds, née Barnish, (1874-1951) was an English artist who, working in oils and watercolours, was known for her still-life and landscape paintings.

Biography
Born in Wigan, Edmonds studied at the Liverpool School of Art during 1921 and 1922 and then at the Atelier Delbos in Paris throughout 1923 and 1924.
In Britain she was a frequent exhibitor at the Royal Academy, with the Society of Women Artists, the Royal Cambrian Academy and the Royal Society of British Artists. Her work was also shown at the Paris Salon in 1938. For many years Edmonds lived in Conway in north Wales.

References

1874 births
1951 deaths
20th-century English painters
20th-century English women artists
Alumni of Liverpool John Moores University
English women painters
People from Wigan